George Brancato (May 27, 1931 – October 22, 2019) was an American/Canadian gridiron football player and coach.

Both an offensive and defensive player in college, he played five games for the Chicago Cardinals during the 1954 NFL season. He rushed the ball twice for 26 yards and caught three passes for 28 yards. In 1955 he played in the Cardinals' defensive backfield. He joined the Montreal Alouettes of the Canadian Football League as halfback for the 1956 season. He played defensive back for the Ottawa Rough Riders for seven seasons, occasionally playing on offense.

After his retirement, he taught phys ed at Laval High and Montreal's Loyola High School before returning to Ottawa as an assistant coach. In 1974 he was promoted to head coach after Coach of the Year Jack Gotta left to become head coach and general manager of the World Football League's Birmingham Americans. In 1975 he won the Annis Stukus Trophy as CFL's Coach of the Year after a first place 10-5-1 finish. The following season, he defeated the Saskatchewan Roughriders, 23–20, in the 64th Grey Cup. In 1981, his 5–11 Rough Riders came close to causing a massive upset in that year's Grey Cup versus the Edmonton Eskimos. After a 4–12 1984 season he was relieved of his coaching duties and appointed director of player personnel.

In 1989, he was hired to coach the Chicago Bruisers of the Arena Football League. After the team folded he served as an assistant under Ernie Stautner with the expansion Dallas Texans.

He returned to Ottawa in 1993 as Ron Smeltzer's special teams and secondary coach. That same year, he was the head coach of the UCCB Capers gridiron football team, which lasted only one season. The following season, he served as the offensive coordinator of the Shreveport Pirates. His next coaching job was as Defensive coordinator of the Anaheim Piranhas. In 1999, he returned to the AFL with the Florida Bobcats as the team's defensive coordinator. It was his final coaching job as he retired at the end of the season.

References

1931 births
2019 deaths
American football defensive backs
American football running backs
Canadian football defensive backs
Canadian football running backs
Chicago Bruisers coaches
Chicago Cardinals players
LSU Tigers football players
Montreal Alouettes players
Ottawa Rough Riders players
Santa Ana Dons football players
Sportspeople from Brooklyn
Players of American football from New York City
Coaches of American football from New York (state)